Piazza di Monte Citorio or Piazza Montecitorio is a piazza in Rome.  It is named after the Monte Citorio, one of the minor hills of Rome.

The piazza contains the Obelisk of Montecitorio and the Palazzo Montecitorio. The base of the column of Antoninus Pius was also once sited here.

Monte Citorio, Piazza di
Rome R. III Colonna